Mandy Minella was the defending champion, but chose not to participate as she was on maternity leave.

Ann Li won the title, defeating Marta Kostyuk in the final, 7–5, 1–6, 6–3.

Seeds

Draw

Finals

Top half

Bottom half

References

Main Draw

Bellatorum Resources Pro Classic - Singles